Octolobus is a genus of tropical forest trees in the family Malvaceae, subfamily Sterculioideae (previously placed in the Sterculiaceae). They are found in Central and West Africa and are closely related to the genus Cola.

Species
Plants of the World Online lists:
 Octolobus grandis Exell
 Octolobus heteromerus K.Schum.
 Octolobus spectabilis Welw. - type species

References

External links
 
 

Sterculioideae
Trees of Africa
Malvaceae genera